Exopalpus is a genus of parasitic flies in the family Tachinidae. There are about nine described species in Exopalpus.

Species
These nine species belong to the genus Exopalpus:
 Exopalpus andina (Townsend, 1914)
 Exopalpus bicolor Macquart, 1851
 Exopalpus demoticoides (Brauer & Bergenstamm, 1889)
 Exopalpus forreri (Wulp, 1894)
 Exopalpus infuscata (Wulp, 1888)
 Exopalpus intermedia (Wulp, 1890)
 Exopalpus minor (Curran, 1925)
 Exopalpus notata (Bigot, 1888)
 Exopalpus ochracea (Townsend, 1914)

References

Further reading

 
 
 
 

Tachinidae
Articles created by Qbugbot